Arthur & George (2005) is the tenth novel by English author Julian Barnes which takes as its basis the true story of the "Great Wyrley Outrages".

Plot introduction
Set at the turn of the 20th century, the story follows the separate but intersecting lives of two very different British men: a half-Indian solicitor and son of a vicar, George Edalji, and the world-famous author of the Sherlock Holmes stories, Sir Arthur Conan Doyle. Roughly one-third of the book traces the story of Edalji's trial, conviction, and imprisonment for a crime he did not commit. About one-third of the book traces the story of Doyle's life and his relationships with his first wife Louisa Hawkins and his platonic lover Jean Leckie. Roughly one-third of the book concerns Doyle's attempt to clear the name of Edalji and uncover the true culprit of the crime. Julian Barnes called it "a contemporary novel set in the past" and the book does not aim to stick closely to the historical record at every point.

Characters in Arthur & George
George Edalji, solicitor in Birmingham
Charlotte Edalji née Stoneham, George's mother
Shapurji Edalji, George's father, vicar of Great Wyrley
Maud Edalji, George's sister
Mr. Meek, George's lawyer
Sir Arthur Conan Doyle, the famous author
Jean Leckie, Conan Doyle's second wife
Louisa Doyle née Hawkins, Doyle's wife
The Mam, Arthur's mother
Connie Doyle Hornung, Arthur's sister
Willie Hornung (E. W. Hornung), Connie's husband
Mary Doyle, Arthur and Louisa's daughter

Dramatisation
Playwright David Edgar has dramatized the work for the Birmingham Repertory Theatre, with the opening performance scheduled for 19 March 2010.

In 2014, for broadcast in 2015, ITV commissioned a three-part television series Arthur & George based on Arthur & George, starring Martin Clunes as Arthur Conan Doyle.

Awards and nominations
 2005 Booker Prize shortlist
 2007 International Dublin Literary Award shortlist

Release details
2005, UK, Jonathan Cape , Pub date 7 July 2005, hardback
2005, Canada, Random House , Pub date 9 September 2005, hardback
2006, USA, Alfred A. Knopf , Pub date 3 January 2006, hardback

References

3. Oldfield, Roger Outrage: The Edalji Five and the Shadow of Sherlock Holmes, Vanguard Press

External links
Arthur & George site 
Risinger, D. Michael. (2006). Boxes in Boxes: Julian Barnes, Conan Doyle, Sherlock Holmes and the Edalji Case. International Commentary on Evidence, 4 (2), Article 3, pp. 1–90 

2005 British novels
Novels by Julian Barnes
Historical novels
Arthur Conan Doyle
Jonathan Cape books
Great Wyrley
British novels adapted into television shows
Cultural depictions of Arthur Conan Doyle